Cascade Designs is an American company specializing in outdoor recreation products. It is located in Seattle, Washington and Reno, Nevada, and was founded in 1972 by two former Boeing engineers, who were avid backpackers. Their first product innovation was the self-inflating camping mattress, marketed as Therm-a-Rest.  In 2015, Cascade Designs moved 1/5 of its workforce to Reno to take advantage of lower wages.

Cascade Designs owns the following subsidiaries and/or trademarks:
Mountain Safety Research, acquired in August 2001, makers of outdoor recreation gear started by the legendary Larry Penberthy
Therm-a-Rest, makers of portable sleeping pads
Platypus, makers of hydration systems
SealLine, makers of waterproof bags
Tracks, makers of high-end walking staffs and trekking poles
Varilite, specializing in wheelchair positioning products
PackTowl, specializing in highly packable technical towels

See also 

List of outdoor industry parent companies

References

External links 

Au

Sporting goods manufacturers of the United States
Manufacturing companies based in Seattle
American companies established in 1972
Design companies established in 1972
Manufacturing companies established in 1972